The India International Exchange Limited (India INX) is India's first international stock exchange which is under the ownership of Ministry of Finance, Government of India. It is located at the International Financial Services Centre, GIFT City in Gujarat. 

It was inaugurated by Indian Prime Minister Narendra Modi on 9 January 2017. The trading operations began on 16 January 2017. It operates on EUREX T7, an advanced technology platform.  India INX claims that it is the world's fastest exchange, with a turn-around time of 4 microseconds. It operates 22 hours a day, six days a week. These timings facilitate international investors and Non-Resident Indians to trade from anywhere across the globe at their preferred time.

Operations
In early 2020, the Asian Development Bank raised $118 million from offshore rupee-linked 10-year bonds.  The bonds were listed on India INX.  India INX offers access to the full range of stocks and exchange-traded funds available in US markets.  The daily average volume in foreign stocks in India INX during the month of January 2022 was $5,242.  By May it had risen to $42,954 and to $195,139 in June 2022.  During the last week of June, the daily average volume was $462,036.

See also 
 Bombay Stock Exchange
 Masala bonds
 List of stock exchanges in the Commonwealth of Nations

References

External links 
 

2017 establishments in Gujarat
Bombay Stock Exchange
Stock exchanges in India
Gandhinagar
Financial services companies established in 2017
Indian companies established in 2017